The  or BA (English: Berlin instructions), short for  (English: Instructions for the alphabetical catalog of the public libraries) were a set of bibliographical cataloging rules for public libraries in Germany.

They were developed from 1938 to 1942, built on the much more complicated  (PI) (English: Prussian instructions) created for scientific libraries in 1899 and expanded by DIN 1505 in 1932.

which were based on the Paris Principles (PP) introduced in 1961 and the International Standard Bibliographic Description (ISBD) as of 1971. RAK in turn is in the process of being superseded by the adoption of Resource Description and Access (RDA) since 2015.

See also 
 Anglo-American Cataloging Rules (AACR)
 
 Library catalog

References 

Library history
Library cataloging and classification